Sonai Assembly constituency is one of the 126 assembly constituencies of Assam a north east state of India. Sonai is also part of Silchar Lok Sabha constituency.

Overview 

As per orders of the Delimitation Commission, No.10 Sonai Assembly constituency is composed of the following:Sonai thana [excluding circle Nos. 32 (Part), 65, 66, Boaligrant in circle No. 54 (Part) and Hill Punjee and forest villages] and circle Nos. 28 to 31 and 35 in Silchar thana and circle No. 58 (Part) in Dholai thana in Silchar sub-division.

Members of Legislative Assembly 

 1951: Nanda Kishore Sinha, Indian National Congress
 1957: Nanda Kishore Sinha, Indian National Congress
 1962: Pulakeshi Singh, Indian National Congress
 1967: M. M. Choudhury, Indian National Congress
 1972: Nurul Haque Choudhury, Indian National Congress
 1978: Altaf Hossain Mazumdar, Janata Party
 1980: Nurul Haque Choudhury, Indian National Congress
 1985: Abdul Rob Laskar, Indian National Congress
 1991: Badrinarayan Singh, Bharatiya Janata Party
 1996: Anwar Hussain Laskar, Asom Gana Parishad
 2001: Anwar Hussain Laskar, Samajwadi Party
 2006: Kutub Ahmed Mazumder, Indian National Congress
 2011: Anamul Haque, Indian National Congress
 2016: Aminul Haque Laskar, Bharatiya Janata Party
 2021: Karim Uddin Barbhuiya, All India United Democratic Front

Election results

2021 Results

2016 Results

See also 

 Sonai
 Cachar District
 Silchar

References

External links 
 

Cachar district
Silchar
Assembly constituencies of Assam